John David Hannah (born 23 April 1962) is a Scottish film and television actor. He came to prominence in Four Weddings and a Funeral (1994), for which he was nominated for the BAFTA Award for Best Actor in a Supporting Role as Matthew. His other film appearances include Sliding Doors (1998) and The Mummy trilogy (1999–2008). His television roles include: Dr Iain McCallum in McCallum (1995–1998); D.I. John Rebus in Rebus (2000–2001); Jack Roper in New Street Law (2006–2007); Jake Osbourne in Cold Blood (2007–2008), Quintus Lentulus Batiatus in Spartacus (2010–2011), Jack Cloth in A Touch of Cloth (2012–14), Jason's father (Aeson) in the BBC series Atlantis (2013–15), Dr Holden Radcliffe in Agents of S.H.I.E.L.D. (2016–2017), Colin in Overboard (2018), and Archie Wilson in the BBC series Trust Me.

Early life
Hannah was born in East Kilbride in Lanarkshire, the youngest of three children; he has two older sisters. His mother, Susan, was a cleaner at Marks & Spencer, and his father, John, a toolmaker. He attended Heathery Knowe Primary School then Claremont High School in East Kilbride and went on to an apprenticeship as an electrician. In East Kilbride, he participated in the East Kilbride Rep Theatre Club. At the suggestion of a colleague, after completing his apprenticeship he then attended the prestigious Royal Scottish Academy of Music and Drama.

Career
After graduation, Hannah had parts in theatre productions, films and television, which included leading roles. He broke into the "big-time" with his appearance as Matthew in Four Weddings and a Funeral (1994). Since this breakthrough role, he has played a psychopathic killer alongside Helen Baxendale in Truth or Dare and a mystery-solving pathologist in McCallum. He was a karaoke-mad dead-beat dad in The James Gang, the alcoholic, pilfering but endearing, lovable comic-relief brother of the female lead in The Mummy (1999), The Mummy Returns (2001) and The Mummy: Tomb of the Dragon Emperor (2008) and a Monty Python-quoting romantic comedy love interest in Sliding Doors (1998). Hannah also starred in the axed U.S. series MDs (2002), as well as making guest appearances in Alias (2001), Carnivàle (2002) and Frasier (2003). In 2006 he starred in the drama series New Street Law. In 2007–08, he played a starring role in the ITV crime drama Cold Blood.

On 24 December 1997, Hannah and Scottish Films producer Murray Ferguson established a production company called Clerkenwell Films. Clerkenwell's first big production was the Rebus series, including Black And Blue and The Hanging Garden. However, Rebus was later taken in-house by STV Productions, and Hannah was replaced in the leading role in the series by Ken Stott.

He is the voice of the Co-operative Group adverts in Europe. He played the part of Quintus Lentulus Batiatus, the owner of a gladiator training house, in Spartacus: Blood and Sand and the prequel Spartacus: Gods of the Arena.

Hannah played the recurring role of scientist Holden Radcliffe on Agents of S.H.I.E.L.D. in a recurring role during season three and got promoted to series regular during season four.

Hannah currently plays the role of Dr. Jedidiah Bishop on the medical drama Transplant on NBC.

Personal life
Hannah married actress Joanna Roth on 20 January 1996. The pair met several years before during a studio production of Shakespeare's Measure for Measure. In many of his interviews, he mentions stories from their relationship, such as their visit to London's 'Sri Siam' restaurant where he proposed to her in writing on the tablecloth. They live in Richmond, London with their two children.

Filmography

References

External links

John Hannah on Mellow Magic

1962 births
Living people
Scottish male film actors
Scottish male television actors
People from East Kilbride
Scottish male stage actors
Scottish male Shakespearean actors
People educated at Claremont High School (East Kilbride)